RFA Fort Sandusky (A316) was an armament stores carrier of the Royal Fleet Auxiliary.

Fort Sandusky was laid down on 11 February 1944, launched on 25 November 194, and commissioned on 1 August 1945. The ship was transferred to the RFA on 13 January 1949, and decommissioned on 13 February 1972. Laid up at Rosyth, she arrived at Castellón for scrapping on 10 February 1973.

References

Ships of the Royal Fleet Auxiliary
1944 ships